Nahhas is a surname. Notable people with the surname include:

 Emad El-Nahhas (born 1976), Egyptian footballer and coach
 Marie-Lou Nahhas (born 1989), Lebanese-American actress, model, and activist
 Mustafa el-Nahhas (1879–1965), Egyptian political figure

Arabic-language surnames